Carmela y Rafael (Carmela and Rafael) was a Mexican bolero duet, consisting of singer and actress Carmela Rey (1931–2018) and singer and songwriter Rafael Vázquez (b. 1929). Known as "The Romantic Couple of Mexico", Rey and Vázquez first performed together in 1959 and married that same year. They first recorded for RCA Records and then signed with Musart Records. Carmela y Rafael recorded a total of 121 records and 1,198 songs, and won numerous accolades, including gold and platinum records and two Record World Awards.

References

External links
 Carmela y Rafael discography and album reviews, credits & releases at AllMusic
 Carmela y Rafael albums at Rate Your Music
 Carmela y Rafael discography, album releases & credits at Discogs
 Carmela y Rafael albums to be listened on Spotify
 Carmela y Rafael albums to be listened on YouTube

Musical groups established in 1959
Musical groups established in 2018
Musical groups from Mexico City
RCA Victor artists
Musart Records artists
1959 establishments in Mexico
2018 disestablishments in Mexico